John Brian Tobin (1949 - 1 July 2006) was an Irish hurler. At club level he played with Blackrock and was also a member of the Cork senior hurling team. He usually lined out as a full-back.

Career

Tobin played at juvenile and underage levels with the Blackrock club before joining the club's senior team. He won two County Championship titles and was a part of the team that won the 1972 All-Ireland Club Championship. Tobin first appeared on the inter-county scene during a five-year underage spell with Cork. After being a non-playing substitute on Cork's 1966 All-Ireland Minor Championship-winning team, he later won three successive All-Ireland Under-21 Championship titles between 1968 and 1970. Tobin was drafted onto the Cork senior hurling team in 1968 and played a number of league and tournament games for Cork over the following few seasons, however, he failed to break onto the championship team.

Death

Tobin died after a period of illness on 1 July 2006.

Honours

Blackrock
All-Ireland Senior Club Hurling Championship: 1972
Munster Senior Club Hurling Championship: 1971
Kilkenny Senior Hurling Championship: 1971, 1973

Cork
All-Ireland Under-21 Hurling Championship: 1968, 1969, 1970
Munster Under-21 Hurling Championship: 1968, 1969, 1970
All-Ireland Minor Hurling Championship: 1966
Munster Minor Hurling Championship: 1966, 1967

References

1949 births
2006 deaths
Blackrock National Hurling Club hurlers
Cork inter-county hurlers
People from Kinsale